Kenyentulus is a genus of proturans in the family Acerentomidae.

Species

 Kenyentulus ailaoshanensis Yin, Xie, Zhang & Imadaté, 1995
 Kenyentulus anmashanus Chao, Lee & Chen, 1998
 Kenyentulus beibeiensis Tang & Yin, 1987
 Kenyentulus chongqingensis Tang & Yin, 1987
 Kenyentulus ciliciocalyci Yin, 1987
 Kenyentulus condei (Prabhoo, 1975)
 Kenyentulus daliensis Yin, Xie, Zhang & Imadaté, 1995
 Kenyentulus datongensis Imadaté & Yin, 1983
 Kenyentulus dolichadeni Yin, 1987
 Kenyentulus fanjingensis Yin, 1992
 Kenyentulus hainanensis Yin, 1987
 Kenyentulus hauseri Imadaté, 1991
 Kenyentulus henanensis Yin, 1983
 Kenyentulus hubeinicus Yin, 1987
 Kenyentulus imadatei Nakamura, 1997
 Kenyentulus japonicus (Imadaté, 1961)
 Kenyentulus jianfengensis Yin, 1987
 Kenyentulus jinghongensis Yin, 1983
 Kenyentulus jinjiangensis Tang & Yin, 1986
 Kenyentulus jiuzhaiensis Tang & Yin, 1986
 Kenyentulus kangdingensis Tang & Yin, 1987
 Kenyentulus kenyanus (Condé, 1948)
 Kenyentulus kunmingensis Yin, Xie, Zhang & Imadaté, 1995
 Kenyentulus malaysiensis (Imadaté, 1965)
 Kenyentulus medogensis Yin, 1983
 Kenyentulus menglunensis Yin, Xie, Zhang & Imadaté, 1995
 Kenyentulus minys Yin, 1983
 Kenyentulus monlongensis Yin, 1983
 Kenyentulus monticolus Nakamura, 1990
 Kenyentulus ohyamai (Imadaté, 1965)
 Kenyentulus sakimori (Imadaté, 1977)
 Kenyentulus sanjianus (Imadaté, 1965)
 Kenyentulus serdinensis Chao, Lee & Chen, 1998
 Kenyentulus setosus Imadaté & So, 1992
 Kenyentulus shennongjiensis Yin, 1987
 Kenyentulus xiaojinshanensis Yin, Xie, Zhang & Imadaté, 1995
 Kenyentulus xingshanensis Yin, 1987
 Kenyentulus yaanensis Tang & Yin, 1987
 Kenyentulus yayukae Imadaté, 1989
 Kenyentulus yinae Nakamura, 1997

References

Protura
Arthropods of Asia